The Edward Murrow Award is a journalism award given by the Overseas Press Club of America annually since 1978, for "Best TV interpretation or documentary on international affairs."

See also

 List of American television awards

References

External links 
 OPC: Recipients of the Edward Murrow Award

Edward R. Murrow Awards